"Isle of Innisfree" is a 1950 song composed by Dick Farrelly.

Isle of Innisfree may also refer to:

 , a ro-pax ferry built in 1991 and operated under the Isle of Innisfree name from 2021 onwards
 , a ro-pax ferry completed in 1986 and operated under the Isle of Innisfree name between 1992 and 1995
 , a ro-pax ferry built in 1995 and operated under the Isle of Innisfree name between 1995 and 2002

See also
 "The Lake Isle of Innisfree", an 1888 poem by William Butler Yeats
 Innisfree (disambiguation)